Twitching in Time is the thirteenth album by the indie rock band Elf Power. It was released in 2017 on Orange Twin.

Track listing
All songs written by Andrew Rieger except where noted.
 "Halloween Out Walking"
 "Ten Dollars on the Ground"
 "Watery Shreds" (Laura Carter)
 "The Cat Trapped in the Wall"
 "Sniper in the Balcony"
 "All Things Combined"
 "In a Room"
 "Too Many Things in My Hands"
 "Cycling Aimlessly"
 "Cold Vines"
 "Twitching in Time"
 "Melted Down"
 "Withered Husk"
 "Gorging on the Feast"

Personnel
 Andrew Rieger – guitars, vocals, flute, zanzithophone, keyboards, bass, percussion
 Laura Carter – keyboards, vocals, Moog synthesizer, zanzithophone, loops
 Matthew Garrison – bass, vocals
 Peter Alvanos – drums, vocals, percussion
 Davey Wrathgabar – guitars, vocals

References

2017 albums
Elf Power albums
Orange Twin albums